The Sundvolden GP is a one-day cycling race held in Norway. It is part of UCI Europe Tour in category 1.2. The race was named Hadeland GP until 2016.

Winners

References

External links

Cycle races in Norway
2013 establishments in Norway
Recurring sporting events established in 2013
UCI Europe Tour races
Summer events in Norway